George Bradshaw (1801–1853) was an English cartographer, printer and publisher.

George Bradshaw may also refer to:
George Bradshaw (footballer) (1904–1951), English footballer for Blackpool, Bury and Tranmere Rovers
George Bradshaw (footballer, born 1913), English footballer for Bury, New Brighton, Doncaster Rovers, Everton and Oldham Athletic
 George Bradshaw (writer) (1909–1973), American journalist
George Bradshaw (baseball) (1924–1994), American baseball player